GUNT, Gunt, or Gunts may refer to:
Transitional Government of National Unity, a former government of Chad
GUNT offensive, a military operation of the Chadian–Libyan conflict

Geography 
Dogor Gunt, a village in north-eastern Afghanistan
Gunt River, a river in Tajikistan

People 
Peer Günt, a Finnish hard rock band
Bucky Gunts, Head of Production for NBC Olympics

In fiction 
Raymond Gunt, the main antagonist of the novel Worst. Person. Ever.
Martha Gunt, a character in the film The Witch's Curse